Longford County Council is the authority responsible for local government in County Longford, Ireland. As a county council, it is governed by the Local Government Act 2001. The council is responsible for housing and community, roads and transportation, urban planning and development, amenity and culture, and environment. The council has 18 elected members. Elections are held every five years and are by single transferable vote. The head of the council has the title of Cathaoirleach (Chairperson). The county administration is headed by a Chief Executive, Paddy Mahon. The county town is Longford.

History
Originally meetings of Longford County Council were held at Longford Courthouse in the Main Street and the county secretary's office was subsequently established in Dublin Road. The county council meetings and county administration moved to modern facilities at the new County Hall in Great Water Street in 1992.

Local Electoral Areas and Municipal Districts
Longford County Council is divided into the following local electoral areas and municipal districts, defined by electoral divisions.

Councillors

2019 seats summary

Councillors by electoral area
This list reflects the order in which councillors were elected on 24 May 2019 at the 2019 Longford County Council election.

Notes

Co-options

References

External links

Politics of County Longford
County councils in the Republic of Ireland